Ethambutol/isoniazid/rifampicin, also known as ethambutol/isoniazid/rifampin, is a fixed-dose combination medication used to treat tuberculosis. It contains ethambutol, isoniazid, and rifampicin. It is used either along or with other anti-tuberculosis medication. It is taken by mouth. Side effects are those of the underlying medications. Use may not be suitable in children.

It is on the World Health Organization's List of Essential Medicines.

See also
 Ethambutol/isoniazid/pyrazinamide/rifampicin

References

Further reading

External links 
 
 
 

Combination drugs
Tuberculosis
World Health Organization essential medicines
Wikipedia medicine articles ready to translate